NJM Insurance Group is an American mutual insurance group of companies, offering personal auto, commercial auto, workers' compensation, homeowners, condo, renters, and umbrella insurance. It is headquartered in the West Trenton section of Ewing Township, Mercer County, New Jersey, and serves markets in Connecticut, Delaware, Maryland, New Jersey, New York, Ohio, and Pennsylvania.

History
NJM Insurance Group, originally known as New Jersey Manufacturers Casualty Insurance Company, formed as a workers’ compensation insurance company on June 7, 1913, shortly after New Jersey passed the Workmen’s Compensation Act. The Company’s original goal was to provide cost-effective, safety-conscious, and financially secure insurance to New Jersey business owners. By 1922, the Company was the largest provider of workers’ compensation insurance in New Jersey.

In 1921, NJM began providing insurance for property loss, commercial auto accidents, private automobiles, and homes.

On January 1, 1965, the New Jersey Manufacturers Indemnity Insurance Company (founded as the New Jersey Manufacturers Fire Insurance Company on December 6, 1921) merged into the New Jersey Manufacturers Casualty Insurance Company to form the current legal entity. The merger had been announced on April 24 of the prior year, with approval being granted by the Commissioner of Insurance on October 28.

NJM’s main office has been in West Trenton, New Jersey since 1966. Personal Lines and Commercial Lines Underwriting, General Claims and Medical Services Administration are headquartered there, as are most support services for Company operations. NJM has had additional offices in northern New Jersey since the 1950s, but the Company's main North Jersey branch has been consolidated in Parsippany since 1996. The southern New Jersey branch opened in Hammonton in 2000.

In 2015, American soccer player and long-time NJM policyholder Carli Lloyd was announced as NJM's new spokesperson.

In 2018, NJM expanded its services to Pennsylvania residents.

Products and Services

Personal Insurance 
NJM provides auto, homeowners, renters, condo, and umbrella insurance to residents of New Jersey, Pennsylvania, Connecticut, Ohio and Maryland. NJM partners with American Modern Insurance Group to offer coverage for motorcycles, ATVs, boats, and collector cars.

Commercial Insurance 
NJM originally formed to provide workers' compensation insurance to businesses in New Jersey. Today, it writes workers’ compensation coverage in Connecticut, Delaware, Maryland, New Jersey, New York, and Pennsylvania. The Company has also provided New Jersey businesses with commercial auto insurance and commercial general liability insurance (CGL).

Consumer safety and corporate giving 
NJM runs several Teen Driver Safety Programs, which bring safety programming and education to New Jersey schools. In 2013, NJM commemorated its centennial with a “DNT TXT N DRV” (Don’t Text and Drive) campaign. The company donated $50,000 to charity at the conclusion of the campaign, which marked the start of NJM’s Teen Driver Safety Programs.

Since 2013, NJM has donated more than 60 driving simulators to New Jersey and Pennsylvania high schools to support safe driving.

The company supports New Jersey philanthropic organizations, including HomeFront’s Camp Mercer, the Trenton Area Soup Kitchen, Junior Achievement of NJ, Habitat for Humanity, and others.

Partnerships and sponsorships

Choose New Jersey 
NJM is an ambassador of Choose New Jersey, which supports economic development in New Jersey.

Greater Trenton 
NJM’s Vice President of Public Affairs, Mike Van Wagner, participates on Greater Trenton’s Board of Directors.

Trenton Thunder 
NJM partners with the Trenton Thunder, the Double-A affiliate of the New York Yankees, for “Safe at Home.” Since 2012, this partnership has resulted in donations of more than $88,700 to Trenton-area organizations.

Philadelphia 76ers 
Since 2018, NJM has partnered with the Philadelphia 76ers to promote teen driving safety in Pennsylvania. In 2018 and 2019, the Sixers and NJM hosted a National Teen Driver Safety Week kick-off event at the Wells Fargo Center in Philadelphia.

Philadelphia Union 
In 2019, NJM became the Official Automotive Insurance Partner of the Philadelphia Union.

New Jersey State Golf Association 
NJM is a Corporate Partner of the New Jersey State Golf Association (NJSGA) and the presenting sponsor of its Senior Amateur Championship.

Financial Strength and Recognition

AM Best Company financial strength rating: A+ (Superior rating), and Financial Size Category: XV. , NJM's Best rating has been “A” or better every year except for a "C" rating in 1933.
NJM generated zero valid complaints in 2010, 2012, and 2013, according to the New Jersey Department of Banking and Insurance. NJM regularly receives among the lowest complaint ratios of all carriers insuring at least 100,000 vehicles in New Jersey.
NJM was the first company to receive J.D. Power’s Personal Auto Claims Certification in 2018. In 2019, J.D. Power ranked NJM Insurance Company among the best for overall satisfaction in its U.S. Auto Insurance Study.
In 2019, Forbes included NJM on its list of America’s Best Employers by State and Best Midsize Employers.
Clearsurance awarded NJM the #1 ranking for consumer’s choice among car insurance companies in 2018 and the #2 ranking in 2019.
In 2016, NJM was the New Jersey State Governor’s Jefferson Award Honoree for its corporate giving program.
The National Safety Council awarded NJM with the Teen Driver Safety Leadership Award in 2016, recognizing the Teen Driver Safety Program for its demonstrated results in changing behaviors and attitudes in young drivers and reducing teen crashes, injuries, and deaths. 
In 2019, PR Daily awarded NJM the Corporate Social Responsibility Award for Public Health or Safety Initiative for the Teen Driver Safety Program.
In 2022, Nerdwallet listed NJM a "top insurance company heading into 2022."

References

External links
 

Ewing Township, New Jersey
Insurance companies of the United States
Mutual insurance companies of the United States
Financial services companies established in 1913
Companies based in Mercer County, New Jersey
1913 establishments in New Jersey
Financial services companies based in New Jersey